The 1965 UCI Road World Championships took place from 2-5 September 1965 in San Sebastián, Spain.

Results

Medal table

External links 

 Men's results
 Women's results
  Results at sportpro.it

 
UCI Road World Championships by year
Uci Road World Championships, 1965
Cycling competitions in Spain
1965 in road cycling